The Afon Ysgethin is a short river in Gwynedd, Wales. Flowing entirely within Snowdonia National Park it rises beneath the peaks of Y Llethr and Diffwys within the Rhinogs mountain range and runs in a generally ESE direction towards Cardigan Bay.

Headwater streams flow into a small upper lake, Llyn Dulyn, and Llyn Bodlyn reservoir. Originally a natural lake, Llyn Bodlyn was enlarged in 1894 to provide Barmouth with water.
The river emerging from the reservoir is crossed by a historic track at Pont Scethin. This old stone arch bridge ("probably 18th century") was once used by packhorses and drovers moving between Harlech and London.

A further 3 km downstream the river enters a narrower wooded valley and is crossed by Pont Fadog. An inscription on the bridge states that it was improved in 1762 by a mason called H. Edward, who was commissioned by William Vaughan, a member of the powerful owner family of nearby  Cors-y-gedol hall (see Dyffryn Ardudwy).

There are two further crossings at the village of Tal-y-bont: by the A496 road and by the Cambrian Coast railway. After another 1 km, the Afon Ysgethin enters the sea.

Gallery

References

Ysgethin
Ysgethin